Nalu is an energy drink produced by The Coca-Cola Company, sold in the Benelux. The drink is available in seven flavours, and contains carbonated water, sucrose and sweeteners, fruit juices, caffeine and B vitamins. The drink was launched in 2002. Its name stems from the Hawaiian word nalu, meaning wave or surf; the surf theme is maintained in the branding of the drink.

References

Coca-Cola brands
Energy drinks
Soft drinks